Liebenau can refer to:

 Places in Germany
Liebenau, Hesse, a town in the district of Kassel, Hesse
Liebenau, Lower Saxony, a municipality in the district of Nienburg, Lower Saxony
 Liebenau (Samtgemeinde), a former collective municipality which included Liebenau, Lower Saxony
 Liebenau monastery, a former Dominican monastery in Worms, Germany

 Places in Austria
Liebenau (Graz), a district of the city of Graz, Styria
Stadion Graz-Liebenau, a football stadium in Graz-Liebenau
Liebenau, Upper Austria, a municipality in the district of Freistadt, Upper Austria

 Places in Czech Republic
 Liebenau, Bohemia, historic name, now Hodkovice nad Mohelkou

 Places in Poland
 Gmina Lubrza, Lubusz Voivodeship, known as Liebenau prior to 1945 when the area known as the Neumark was German territory